Mexican Spitfire's Elephant is a 1942 American comedy film directed by Leslie Goodwins and written by Charles E. Roberts. It is the sequel to the 1942 film Mexican Spitfire Sees a Ghost. The film stars Lupe Vélez, Leon Errol, Walter Reed, Elisabeth Risdon, Lydia Bilbrook, Marion Martin, Lyle Talbot and Luis Alberni. The film was released on September 11, 1942, by RKO Pictures.

Plot

Cast 
 Lupe Vélez as Carmelita Lindsay
 Leon Errol as Uncle Matt Lindsay / Lord Basil Epping 
 Walter Reed as Dennis Lindsay
 Elisabeth Risdon as Aunt Della Lindsay
 Lydia Bilbrook as Lady Ada Epping
 Marion Martin as Diana De Corro
 Lyle Talbot as Reddy
 Luis Alberni as Luigi
 Arnold Kent as Jose Alvarez
 Keye Luke as Lao Lee
 Tom Kennedy as Joe the Bartender

References

External links 
 
 
 
 

1942 films
American black-and-white films
RKO Pictures films
Films directed by Leslie Goodwins
1942 comedy films
American comedy films
Films produced by Bert Gilroy
1940s English-language films
1940s American films